Gymnophragma is a monotypic genus of flowering plants belonging to the family Acanthaceae. The only species is Gymnophragma simplex.

Its native range is New Guinea.

References

Acanthaceae
Acanthaceae genera
Monotypic Lamiales genera